Tony Lomo (born 17 December 1983 in Takwa) is a Solomon Islands judoka who competes in the men's 60 kg category.

At the 2012 Summer Olympics, he was defeated in the third round by Sofiane Milous.

At the 2014 Commonwealth Games, he lost to Ghana's Razak Abugiri in the first round.

References

External links
 

Solomon Islands male judoka
1983 births
Living people
Olympic judoka of the Solomon Islands
Judoka at the 2012 Summer Olympics
Commonwealth Games competitors for the Solomon Islands
Judoka at the 2014 Commonwealth Games